Engineering Square (IDG), or "e2, is an Egyptian industrial park, owned and managed by Industrial Development Group (IDG).
 The park is designed and built on a total area of 3.1 million square meter, located in 6 October City, Giza, Egypt.

The e2 Industrial Park was founded in February 2008 with the goal of accommodating prominent multinational and local companies in Egypt. An environmental impact assessment was carried out in 2011.

Industry fields 

Industries represented include Engineering, Auto spare parts, Garments, Foods, Cosmetics, and Plastic films.

 YTD assigned factories:106
 YTD factories operating:40
 YTD factories under construction:27

Among the investors 

 Aramex
 Bostik Egypt
 Chloride Egypt
 Döhler Egypt
 Egypt Foods Group
 Elif Global Packing
 Flex P Films Egypt
 Naffco
 Nuqal Group
 Pegas Nonwovens Egypt LLC

References

External links
 Engineering Square

Industrial parks
Industry in Egypt